Noel Shaw (10 May 1937 – 10 December 2017) was an Australian cricketer. He had played one first-class cricket match for Victoria in 1958.

See also
 List of Victoria first-class cricketers

References

External links
 

1937 births
2017 deaths
Australian cricketers
Victoria cricketers
Cricketers from Melbourne